James Timothy Callahan (January 12, 1881 – March 9, 1968) was an outfielder in Major League Baseball. He played for the New York Giants in 1902.

External links

1881 births
1968 deaths
Major League Baseball outfielders
New York Giants (NL) players
Baseball players from Pennsylvania
Akron Rubbernecks players
Akron Champs players
People from Carnegie, Pennsylvania